Denis Granečný (born 7 September 1998) is a Czech professional footballer who plays as a defender for FC Zbrojovka Brno.

Career

Club career
He made his senior league debut for Baník Ostrava on 14 February 2016 in a Czech First League 0-3 loss at Mladá Boleslav.

On 4 February 2020, Granečný joined Dynamo České Budějovice on a six-month loan deal. After making only one appearance for the club, he was loaned out again; this time a season-long loan to Dutch Eredivisie club FC Emmen on 13 August 2020. On 24 January 2022, he was loaned to Mezőkövesd in Hungary.

References

External links 
 
 Denis Granečný official international statistics

1996 births
Sportspeople from Ostrava
Living people
Czech footballers
Czech Republic youth international footballers
Czech Republic under-21 international footballers
Association football defenders
FC Baník Ostrava players
SK Dynamo České Budějovice players
FC Emmen players
Mezőkövesdi SE footballers
FC Zbrojovka Brno players
Czech First League players
Eredivisie players
Czech National Football League players
Nemzeti Bajnokság I players
Czech expatriate footballers
Czech expatriate sportspeople in the Netherlands
Expatriate footballers in the Netherlands
Czech expatriate sportspeople in Hungary
Expatriate footballers in Hungary